Two Thousand Acres of Sky  is a British television drama series which aired on BBC Television from 2001 to 2003. It was created and written by Timothy Prager. The Executive Producer was Adrian Bate.

The show takes place on the fictional island of Ronansay off the coast of Skye. The actual filming location was the sea-side village of Port Logan.

In 2008, the Norwegian Broadcasting Corporation created a remake of the series called Himmelblå (in English: Skyblue) taking place on the island of Ylvingen.

Premise

Series 1
Abby is a single mother living in London with her two children. She sees an advertisement for a family with two children to run a B&B on an island off Scotland called Ronansay. The islanders have posted the advert as their local school is due to close due to only three children attending: they need an extra two children to keep the school open. Abby persuades her friend Kenny to pretend to be her husband and they are successful in their application to move to the island.

Series 2
Abby begins a relationship with a local fisherman, called Alistair. Kenny finds this relationship difficult as he is secretly in love with Abby. Kenny in turn begins a relationship with a local girl.

Series 3
After Abby and Alistair end their relationship, Kenny invites Abby's ex-husband Robbie from London to stay. Abby and Robbie decide to give their relationship another chance, so Kenny decides to leave the island.
Kenny dies of exposure on a beach

Cast
 Michelle Collins as Abby Wallace
 Paul Kaye as Kenny Marsh
 Philip Dowling as Alfie Wallace
 Charlotte Graham as Charley Wallace
 Monica Gibb as Mary Raeburn
 Michael Carter as Douglas Raeburn
 John Straiton as Alister McLeod
 Karen Westwood as Carolyn Fraser
 George Anton as Malcolm Campbell
 Paul Ireland as Colin Campbell
 Sarah Lam as Ida Macasaet
 Sean Scanlan as Gordon Macphee
 Elaine C. Smith as Marjorie McGowan
 Jenny Foulds as Heather McGowan
 Andy Gray as Jerry Kennedy, a.k.a. Big Jerry
 Jonathyn Smith as Little Jerry
 Henry Ian Cusick as Dr. Talbot
 Michael Hodgson as Robbie Leonard
 Gerald Lepkowski as Hamish Raeburn
 Ashley Jensen as Ashley Raeburn 
 Iona Donnelly as Hamish & Angie's Daughter
 Samantha Henderson as Hamish & Angie's Youngest Daughter

Episodes

Series 1 (2001)

Series 2 (2002)

Series 3 (2003)

Home media

References

External links

BBC Drama site for Two Thousand Acres of Sky
The location of Two Thousand Acres of Sky

BBC television dramas
2001 British television series debuts
2003 British television series endings
2000s British drama television series
English-language television shows